Emmett Karl Kriel (May 12, 1916 – November 26, 1984) was an American football guard who played for the Philadelphia Eagles of the National Football League (NFL) for one season in 1939.  He played college football for Baylor and he was drafted by the Eagles in the tenth round of the 1938 NFL Draft.

References

1916 births
1984 deaths
American football guards
Baylor Bears football players
Philadelphia Eagles players
Players of American football from Texas
People from Williamson County, Texas
Wilmington Clippers players